Graeme Shaw (born ) is a former professional rugby league footballer who played as a  forward in the 1990s. He played at representative level for Scotland, and at club level for Bradford Northern (Heritage №) and Oldham (Heritage №).

International honours
Jim Shaw won caps for Scotland while at Oldham 1998 2-caps (sub).

References

1975 births
Bradford Bulls players
Living people
Oldham R.L.F.C. players
Place of birth missing (living people)
Scotland national rugby league team players
Rugby league second-rows